Laura Moss (born November 1, 1973 in Kings Mountain, North Carolina) is an American actress of stage and television.

She is most known for being the fifth actress to play Amanda Cory on the soap opera Another World, a role she played from 1996 to 1998. She succeeded Christine Tucci in the role and had the original adult actress, Sandra Ferguson, succeed her in 1998.

On Broadway, she is most known for her role in the most recent adaptation of Death of a Salesman, starring alongside Brian Dennehy. She also reprised her stage role for a television movie of the same name.

In 2016, she co-wrote a manual on Crisis Intervention for first responders published by Growth Publishing.

External links
 
 

American soap opera actresses
American television actresses
American stage actresses
1973 births
Living people
21st-century American women